The EMD GP30 is a  four-axle diesel-electric locomotive built by General Motors Electro-Motive Division of La Grange, Illinois between July 1961 and November 1963. A total of 948 units were built for railroads in the United States and Canada (2 only), including 40 cabless B units for the Union Pacific Railroad.

It was the first so-called "second generation" EMD diesel locomotive, and was produced in response to increased competition by a new entrant, General Electric's U25B, which was released roughly at the same time as the GP30. The GP30 is easily recognizable due to its high profile and stepped cab roof, unique among American locomotives. A number are still in service today in original or rebuilt form.

History

Development
The GP30 was conceived out of the necessity of matching new competitor GE's U25B. The U25B also featured a sealed, airtight long hood with a single inertial air intake for electrical cooling, with a pressurized cooling system which kept dust out of the engine and equipment area. Finally, the entire GE design was optimized for ease of access and maintenance. The U25B demonstrators were receiving much praise—and orders—from the railroads that tested them. Meanwhile, ALCO had been producing the 2,400 hp (1,800 kW) RS-27 since 1959, though it had not sold well.

EMD's engineering department pushed their DC traction system for an extra . The  wasn't quite equivalent to the GE and ALCO offerings, but EMD hoped the railroads' familiarity with EMD equipment would improve their chances. The locomotive in which the 16 cylinder, 567D3 would be fitted, was improved along the lines of the U25B; sealed long hood, central air intake, and engineered for easier maintenance access. The frame and trucks of the GP20 were carried across; the extra equipment for the centralized air system required more space behind the cab, and since the locomotive was not going to be lengthened, extra space was achieved vertically by raising the height of the locomotive, giving room for the central air system, turbocharger and electrical cabinet all behind the cab. This extra height behind the cab meant that the body style used for previous GP units was not suitable.

Since EMD wanted the new locomotive to be visibly modern and updated, they turned to the GM Automotive Styling Center at Troy, Michigan for help. The automobile stylists created the GP30's trademark "hump" and cab roof profile. The hump-like bulge started at the front of the cab and enveloped the air intakes for the central air system and the dynamic brake blister. Units ordered without dynamic brakes were the same shape, but lacked the intakes to cool the dynamic brake resistor grids.

A high short hood could be ordered, but only holdouts Norfolk and Western Railway and Southern Railway received such units. EMD originally planned to name the locomotive the GP22, but EMD's marketing department decided to leapfrog GE's numbering to make the new locomotive seem more advanced. Marketing literature claimed 30 distinct improvements from the GP20 and that this was the reason for the number.

Sales and in service
The GP30 successfully countered the GE threat and kept EMD in the dominant position in the North American diesel market. While losing a little power to the GE and ALCO competition, the solidity and reliability of the GP30—and the familiarity of railroad mechanical departments with EMD products—ultimately won many more orders for EMD. 948 were sold, in comparison to 476 U25Bs. In addition, the GP30 was only sold until the end of 1963, while the U25B was available until 1966.

Most major railroads ordered GP30s, and many smaller ones did too. The largest orders were from the SOU (120), UP (111), ATSF (85), and the B&O (77).

The sole purchaser of B units (by the mid-1960s generally an outdated concept) was the UP, who kept the practice of running its locomotives in matched sets much longer than others. Thirteen of those GP30B units were fitted with steam generators for heating passenger trains, the only GP30s to receive them.  Prior to Amtrak, UP would use a GP30 and two boiler equipped GP30Bs on passenger trains when no E8s or E9s were available.

Some units for the GM&O, MILW and SOO were built using trucks from ALCO trade-ins and therefore ride on ARR type B trucks instead of the EMD standard Blomberg Bs. An indisputable tribute to the quality of the GP30 design is the fact that a good number are still in service as of 2015, which is a service lifespan of over 50 years and well in excess of the design life of 25–30 years for the average diesel locomotive. Furthermore, when life-expired, some railroads chose to give them major rebuilds instead of scrapping them.

Specifically, the Burlington Northern rebuilt GP30 (and GP35) units to the specifications of the later GP39. These rebuilds (known as GP39Es, GP39Ms and GP39Vs) came not only from the ranks of the units the BN inherited from its own merger, but from the Union Pacific, Southern Pacific, SAL, Southern and others. Some of these units received new EMD spartan cabs.

The Chessie System rebuilt its GP30 units into GP30Ms, adding newer components, new traction motors and reducing their power to 2000 hp. They lasted with CSX into the mid-to-late 1990s, long after Seaboard System GP30s had been sold, retired and scrapped, or turned into road slugs.

Original buyers

Cab-equipped 'A' units

Cabless booster 'B' units

Rebuilds

The Burlington Northern Railroad was the most extensive user of rebuilt GP30s. Finding a need for modernized units of lower power, it sent GP30s—-both its own and units purchased from other railroads-—to be rebuilt. Seventy units were sent to EMD, 65 to Morrison Knudsen (now Washington Group International) and 25 to VMV for rebuilding, and the rebuilds are known as GP39E, GP39M, and GP39V respectively. The changes included new generators, Dash-2 modular electronic control systems and 567D3 engines upgraded with EMD 645-series power assemblies, rated at 2,300 hp (1,720 kW) and designated 12-645D3. These units are still in service on locals and smaller lines throughout the BNSF Railway system.

The Atchison, Topeka and Santa Fe Railway (ATSF) had previously, performed a similar upgrade in its own Cleburne, Texas shops, stripping the locomotives down to bare metal and rebuilding with new equipment. The 567D3 engines were upgraded to a 2500-horsepower rating by the use of 645-series power assemblies. The generators and traction motors were upgraded and control and electrical equipment was replaced. The trucks received Hyatt roller bearings and single-clasp brake systems. Rooftop air conditioners and new horns were added. The locomotives were repainted in the blue and yellow Yellowbonnet scheme, and designated GP30u (for upgraded). 78 of these survived until the BNSF merger, and were eventually all sold off. In 2016, BNSF traded Larry's Truck and Electric (LTEX) 26 GP38s for 24 of the Ex-ATSF GP30u's for their GP39-3 rebuild program. The Reading Blue Mountain and Northern Railroad acquired a total of 6 of the former BNSF/ATSF GP30u's from LTEX and designates them as GP39RN locomotives.

These were designated GP30C.

The Illinois Central Gulf Railroad rebuilt two GP30s in the early 1980s. These units were designated GP26. , the units remain in service on the Cimarron Valley Railroad.

Preserved units
Many GP30s have been preserved by a variety of museums, societies and tourist railways. All preserved examples are cab units, as the cabless booster units have been scrapped. A number of these preserved locomotives are in operational condition. The following is a list of preserved GP30s in North America.

Baltimore & Ohio #6944 is preserved and operable at the B&O Railroad Museum in Baltimore, Maryland.
Branson Scenic #99, formerly Baltimore & Ohio 6973, is currently in operation on the Branson Scenic Railway as the south end locomotive.
Canadian Pacific #5000 (one of only two GP30s built in Canada) is preserved in its as-retired condition at the Alberta Railway Museum in Edmonton, Alberta.
Conrail #2233, a former PRR engine, is at the Railroad Museum of Pennsylvania. It is believed to be serviceable, but is currently a static display. It formerly operated on the West Shore Railroad in Lewisburg, PA between the late 1980s and early 2000s and was repainted in its original PRR colors during that time.
Cotton Belt #5006 is preserved at the Arkansas Railroad Museum in Pine Bluff, Arkansas.
Denver & Rio Grande Western #3011 is preserved at the Colorado Railroad Museum in Golden, Colorado.
New Hope & Ivyland #2198, formerly Pennsylvania Railroad 2250 is currently running in daily service hauling tourist trains in New Hope, Pennsylvania
Nickel Plate Road #900 is preserved at the Mad River & NKP Railroad Museum in Bellevue, Ohio.
Nickel Plate Road #901 is preserved, and operating for the Cincinnati Railway Company, Lebanon Mason Monroe Railroad, and the Cincinnati Dinner Train.
Nickel Plate Road #902 is operating for the  Cincinnati Railway Company, Lebanon Mason Monroe Railroad, and the Cincinnati Dinner Train.
Norfolk & Western #522 is preserved in operating condition by the Roanoke Chapter of the National Railway Historical Society, and is currently operates as power for occasional short runs in Roanoke, Va.
Reading #5513, the first production GP30, is preserved by the Reading Company Technical & Historical Society in Hamburg, Pennsylvania. Operational in the 1980s and 1990s, it is currently awaiting repair.
RBMN #2535, a GP30u of Santa Fe heritage is preserved in operating condition and currently in active service at the Lehigh Gorge Scenic Railway in Jim Thorpe, Pennsylvania
Soo Line #700 is preserved at the Lake Superior Railroad Museum in Duluth, Minnesota, restored for use on their North Shore Scenic Railroad.
Soo Line #703 is preserved at the Colfax Railroad Museum in Colfax, Wisconsin.
Southern #2594 is preserved at the Southeastern Railway Museum in Duluth, Georgia and is operational. (currently leased to the Tennessee Valley Railroad Museum)
Southern #2601 is preserved and operational at the North Carolina Transportation Museum in Spencer, North Carolina
Union Pacific #844, the engine that necessitated the renumbering of UP steam engine #844 to #8444 from 1962 to its retirement in 1989, is preserved and in use at the Nevada State Railroad Museum Boulder City in Boulder City.
Union Pacific #849 is preserved at the Western Pacific Railroad Museum.
Waldens Ridge Railroad #1030, still in Seaboard System paint is on loan from the Southern Appalachia Railway Museum to the Orlando Northwestern Railroad operating excursions in the Orlando area, and waiting to be restored back to its original Louisville and Nashville appearance.
Waldens Ridge Railroad #2561 and #2608, both former Southern locomotives are preserved at the Southern Appalachia Railway Museum.
Western Maryland #501 & #502 (501 is ex- Pennsylvania Railroad 2249 and 502 is ex- Reading Company 5507) are preserved with 501 in active service on the Western Maryland Scenic.
Wisconsin Central #715, a former Soo Line engine, is preserved at the National Railroad Museum in Green Bay, Wisconsin.
MJRX 711(Railway Service Contractors, Kansas City,Kansas) (built as Soo Line 711) is used to load grain cars at a cooperative in Madelia, MN
Baltimore and Ohio Railroad #6955 is currently undergoing restoration to operation at the Cincinnati Scenic Railway.

See also 

List of GM-EMD locomotives
List of GMD Locomotives

References

 
 Goodman, Eric. ATSF GP30u Project. Retrieved on February 1, 2005.
 
 
 
 Komanesky, John. Preserved EMD Locomotives: All except Cab Units and Switchers. Retrieved on February 2, 2005.
 
 Sarberenyi, Robert. EMD GP30 Original Owners. Retrieved on August 27, 2006
 Strack, Don. Union Pacific's EMD GP30s. Retrieved on February 2, 2005.
 Trainpix.com. BNSF Motive Power Roster. Retrieved on February 1, 2005.
 The Alberta Railway Museum website. . Retrieved on February 19, 2011.
 http://utahrails.net/ajkristopans/ROADSWITCHERS567.php#gp30 Build dates, order and serial numbers

Further reading 
 
 
 

GP30
GP30
Railway locomotives introduced in 1961
Locomotives with cabless variants
B-B locomotives
Freight locomotives
Standard gauge locomotives of Canada
Diesel-electric locomotives of the United States
Standard gauge locomotives of the United States